Břehy is a municipality and village in Pardubice District in the Pardubice Region of the Czech Republic. It has about 1,100 inhabitants.

Notable people
Petr Jakeš (1940–2005), geologist

Gallery

References

External links

Villages in Pardubice District